Takanobu Nishi (born 12 March 1951) is a Japanese archer. He competed in the men's individual event at the 1976 Summer Olympics.

References

1951 births
Living people
Japanese male archers
Olympic archers of Japan
Archers at the 1976 Summer Olympics
Place of birth missing (living people)